Bugang station is a railway station on the Gyeongbu Line in Bugang-myeon, Sejong City, Republic of Korea.

Railway stations in Sejong